
Gmina Biesiekierz is a rural gmina (administrative district) in Koszalin County, West Pomeranian Voivodeship, in north-western Poland.

Villages
Gmina Biesiekierz contains the villages and settlements of Biesiekierz, Cieszyn, Gniazdowo, Kotłowo, Kraśnik Koszaliński, Laski Koszalińskie, Nosowo, Nowe Bielice, Parnówko, Parnowo, Parsowo, Rutkowo, Stare Bielice, Starki, Świeminko, Świemino, Tatów, Warnino and Witolubie.

Neighbouring gminas
Gmina Biesiekierz is bordered by the city of Koszalin and by the gminas of Będzino, Białogard, Karlino and Świeszyno.

References
Polish official population figures 2006

Biesiekierz
Koszalin County